On 9 September 2005, an Air Kasaï Antonov An-26B crashed in the Republic of the Congo north of Brazzaville, killing all 13 people on board.

Accident 
Antonov An-26B 9Q-CFD was on a domestic flight in the Democratic Republic of the Congo from Kinshasa to Boende Airport in Boende on 9 September 2005. Its route took it over the neighboring Republic of Congo, where at about 15:45 local time it crashed about 50 km (31 miles) north of Brazzaville. All 13 people aboard (four crew members and nine passengers) died in the crash.

Aircraft 
The aircraft was a twin-engine Antonov An-26B, manufacturer's serial number either 10605 or 12901 (sources differ). It had first flown in 1983 and was registered as 9Q-CFD.

References

External links 

 

2005 disasters in the Republic of the Congo 
Airliner accidents and incidents with an unknown cause
Aviation accidents and incidents in the Democratic Republic of the Congo
Aviation accidents and incidents in the Republic of the Congo
Aviation accidents and incidents in 2005
Accidents and incidents involving the Antonov An-26
September 2005 events in Africa